Adán Amezcua Contreras (born c. 1969), along with his brothers Jesús and Luis, was a leader of the Colima Cartel, a Mexican methamphetamine and precursor drug smuggling organization.

Arrest
On November 10, 1997, Adán Amezcua was arrested in his hometown of Colima, Col., Mexico, on weapons charges. Two years later in March 1999, Adán Amezcua was arrested on money laundering charges; the charges were however dropped 2 months later and he was released.

Kingpin Act sanction
On October 2, 2008, the United States Department of the Treasury sanctioned Amezcua Contreras under the Foreign Narcotics Kingpin Designation Act (sometimes referred to simply as the "Kingpin Act"), for his involvement in drug trafficking along with nine other international criminals and six entities. The act prohibited U.S. citizens and companies from doing any kind of business activity with him, and virtually froze all his assets in the U.S.

See also
Illegal drug trade
Mexican Drug War
Mexico–United States border

References

Living people
Year of birth missing (living people)
Colima Cartel traffickers
People sanctioned under the Foreign Narcotics Kingpin Designation Act
People from Colima City
Mexican people of Basque descent